Rubano is a comune (municipality) in the Province of Padua in the Italian region Veneto, located about  west of Venice and about  northwest of Padua.

The municipality of Rubano contains the frazioni (subdivisions, mainly villages and hamlets) Sarmeola, Bosco, and Villaguattera.

Rubano borders the following municipalities: Mestrino, Padua, Saccolongo, Selvazzano Dentro, Villafranca Padovana.

Demographic evolution

References

External links
 www.rubano.it

Cities and towns in Veneto